Michael Neuman may refer to:

 Michael Robert Neuman, engineer at Michigan Technological University
 Michael A. Neuman (born 1955), executive for telecommunications and broadcast television companies
  (born 1990), Swedish-born Slovak figure skater